The 2009 NFL Draft was the seventy-fourth annual meeting of National Football League (NFL) franchises to select newly eligible football players. The draft took place at Radio City Music Hall in New York City, New York, on April 25 and 26, 2009. The draft consisted of two rounds on the first day, starting at 4:00 pm EDT, and five rounds on the second day, starting at 10:00 am EDT. To compensate for the time change from the previous year and in an effort to help shorten the draft, teams were no longer on the clock for 15 minutes in the first round and 10 minutes in the second round. Each team now had 10 minutes to make their selection in the first round and seven minutes in the second round. Rounds three through seven were shortened to five minutes per team. This was the first year that the NFL used this format and it was changed again the following year for the 2010 NFL Draft. The 2009 NFL Draft was televised by both NFL Network and ESPN and was the first to have cheerleaders. The Detroit Lions, who became the first team in NFL history to finish a season at 0–16, used the first selection in the draft to select University of Georgia quarterback Matthew Stafford.

It was the first draft since 1983 that saw two centers being selected in the first round—Alex Mack at No. 21 to the Browns, and Eric Wood at No. 28 to the Bills. It was also the first time since the 1993 draft that a Miami Hurricanes player was not selected in the first round. As of the end of the 2018 season, the 2009 Draft has seen 11 of the 32 first-round selections make the Pro Bowl, and 27 (including three punters) in total for the entire class. It has been referred to as one of the worst drafts in league history. This was the first time that a Mr. Irrelevant went on to win a Super Bowl (Ryan Succop).

Overview
The following is the breakdown of the 256 players selected by position:

Player selections

Trades

In the explanations below, (D) denotes trades that took place during the draft, while (PD) indicates trades completed pre-draft.

Round one

Round two

Round three

Round four

Round five

Round six

Round seven

Supplemental draft selections
One player was selected in the 2009 Supplemental Draft:

Notable undrafted players

Selections by conference
Selection totals by college conference:

Selections by position

See also 
 List of first overall National Football League draft picks
 Mr. Irrelevant – the list of last overall National Football League draft picks

References

General references
2009 NFL Draft at Pro Football Reference
2009 NFL Draft at ESPN

Trade references

Specific references

National Football League Draft
NFL Draft
Draft
NFL draft
Radio City Music Hall
NFL Draft
American football in New York City
2000s in Manhattan
Sporting events in New York City
Sports in Manhattan